Christopher Lau Gar-hung (born 8 February 1976 in Hong Kong) was the chairman of People Power political party in Hong Kong. He is a presenter for Hong Kong People Reporter and MyRadio. He ran for office in the 2012 Hong Kong legislative election.

Background
Lau studied in Diocesan Boys' School for secondary school and graduated from Chinese University of Hong Kong with a degree in Mathematics. He worked as a retirement benefits consultant in multiple companies. In 2012, he teamed up Stephen Shiu and Jeff Au-yeung to run in the Hong Kong legislative election.

Chairman Resignation
On 20 June 2013, Lau resigned from the People Power chairman, but he denied this related to internal disputes with former party member, Wong Yuk-man.

References

External links
People Power Hong Kong Island

1976 births
Living people
Hong Kong radio presenters
Hong Kong financial businesspeople
People Power (Hong Kong) politicians